Marketing automation refers to software platforms and technologies designed for marketing departments and organizations to more effectively market on multiple channels online (such as email, social media, websites, etc.) and automate repetitive tasks.

Marketing departments, consultants and part-time marketing employees benefit by specifying criteria and outcomes for tasks and processes which are then interpreted, stored and executed by software, which increases efficiency and reduces human error. Originally focused on  email marketing automation, marketing automation refers to a broad range of automation and analytic tools for marketing especially inbound marketing. Marketing automation platforms are used as a hosted or web-based solution, and no software installation is required by a customer.

The use of a marketing automation platform is to streamline sales and marketing organizations by replacing high-touch, repetitive manual processes with automated solutions.

A marketing automation platform allows marketers to scale lead management activities, such as coordinating and managing marketing campaigns, both online and offline), nurturing leads, and scoring leads appropriately to determine if / when it is ready for sales to engage.

Overview 
Marketing Automation is a subset of customer relationship management (CRM) or customer experience management (CXM) that focuses on the definition, segmentation, scheduling and tracking of marketing campaigns. The use of marketing automation makes processes that would otherwise have been performed manually much more efficient and makes new processes possible. Marketing Automation can be defined as a process where technology is used to automate several repetitive tasks that are undertaken on a regular basis in a marketing campaign.

Marketing Automation platforms allow marketers to automate and simplify client communication by managing complex omnichannel marketing strategies from a single tool. Marketing Automation assists greatly in areas like Lead Generation, Segmentation, Lead nurturing and lead scoring, Relationship marketing, Cross-sell and upsell, Retention, Marketing ROI measurement. Effective marketing automation tools leverage data from a separate or integrated CRM to understand customer impact and preferences.

There are three categories of marketing automation software:
Marketing intelligence Uses tracking codes in social media, email, and webpages to track the behavior of anyone interested in a product or service to gain a measure of intent. It can record which social media group or thread they followed, which link was clicked on in an email or which search term was used to access a website. Multiple link analysis can then track buyer behavior - following links and multiple threads related to product A, but not B will show an interest only in A. This allows more accurately targeted response and the development of a nurturing program specifically targeted towards their interest and vertical market. This allows businesses to more efficiently and effectively reach target consumers who show, through their internet history behavior, that they will be interested in the company's products. Due to its interactive nature, this has been described as Marketing Automation 2.0.
Marketing automation Has a focus on moving leads from the top of the marketing funnel through to becoming sales-ready leads at the bottom of the funnel. Prospects are scored, based on their activities, and receive targeted content and messaging, thus nurturing them from first interest through to sale. Commonly used in business-to-business (B2B), business-to-government (B2G), or longer sales cycle business-to-consumer (B2C) sales cycles, Marketing Automation involves multiple areas of marketing and is really the marriage of email marketing technology coupled with a structured sales process.
Advertising Automation 
Has a focus on automating the process of advertising, usually focusing on the campaign lifecycle management. Automation involves different areas such as media mix model, media planning, scheduling, campaign setting, adserving, and reporting. Applicable to just one or many of these elements, advertising automation focuses on automating either an entire aspect or their most mundane tasks - often with the use of Artificial Intelligence. A clear example is to be found in ad operations (also known as trafficking), which involves the activities around mapping adserver and analytics placement to different media and ad-tech platforms, creating tracking pixels to disseminate across the different media, and management of the UTM parameters — traditionally manually operated across different adtech platforms — that with advertising automation is automated. This generates an automated creation of placement, automated pushing of trackers to the various media, and automatic management of the creation of UTM parameters. While commonly used among big advertisers to simplify complex infrastructures and processes, advertising automation is paving the way to make advertising accessible to unskilled users.
Advanced workflow automation
Encompasses automation of internal marketing processes. These include budgeting and planning, workflow and approvals, the marketing calendar, internal collaboration, digital asset creation, and management and essentially everything that supports the operational efficiency of the internal marketing function. Typically, these systems require a CRM or COM (commercial operations management) administrator to set up a complex series of rules to trigger action items for internal sales and marketing professionals to manually process (designing files, sending letters, sending email campaigns). This type of system increases the marketer's ability to deliver relevant content to relevant individuals at relevant times. Limitations may apply, based on the human resource capacity of an organization and their level of commitment to the tasks as they are assigned. Advanced workflow automation's can be created to support the entire customer journey, including awareness, consideration, decision and long term loyalty.

Effects of GDPR on marketing automation 
As of 25 May 2018 the General Data Protection Regulation came into effect in the EU, this has had a large impact on the way marketing teams and organizations can manage their consumer data. Any organization using marketing automation tracking is required to ask consent from the consumer as well as provide transparency on how the data will be processed.

Impact of marketing automation on consumers

Consumers are directly impacted by marketing automation. Consumers provide data for companies, and companies use algorithms to determine products and services to market towards the consumer. The products and services are personalized based on the collected data for each individual. The use of marketing automation is interpreted as an efficient customer experience while others interpret a loss of autonomy for the consumer.

Functionality 

In order to effectively aid marketers in fully understanding customers and subsequently developing a strategic marketing plan, marketing automation platforms (MAPs) are designed to perform eight key tasks:
 Development and analysis of marketing campaigns and customers
 Management of marketing campaigns
 Appropriate customer data organization and storage
 Moving contacts from leads (marketing prospects) to customers
 Lead scoring to qualify leads by measuring their engagement level
 Integration of multiple touch-points such as email and social media
 Lead management 
 Campaign performance analytics (i.e. open rate or click-through rates on emails, conversion rates on landing pages)

Market 
According to Gartner, the B2B marketing automation market grew 15% in 2020 and was valued at $2.1 billion. Gartner identified the following vendors as B2B marketing automation platform leaders as of August 2021:

 Adobe (Adobe Marketo Engage)
 Creatio (Marketing Creatio)
 HubSpot (Marketing Hub)
 Oracle (Oracle Eloqua)
 Salesforce (Pardot)

See also
 Demand generation
 Lead scoring
 Outbound marketing
 Online marketing platform
 Real-time marketing
 Predictive analytics
 Customer retention
 Data Integration
 Mobile marketing automation
 Email marketing

References

Marketing software